Gamma Gruis or γ Gruis, formally named Aldhanab, is a star in the southern constellation of Grus (it once belonged to the Ptolemaic constellation Piscis Austrinus). With an apparent visual magnitude of 3.0, it is the third-brightest star in Grus.

Nomenclature 

γ Gruis (Latinised to Gamma Gruis) is the system's Bayer designation.

It bore the traditional Arabic name Al Dhanab, from the Arabic  الذنب al-dhanab "the tail" (of the Southern Fish). In 2016, the IAU organized a Working Group on Star Names (WGSN) to catalog and standardize proper names for stars. The WGSN approved the name Aldhanab for this star on 5 September 2017 and it is now so included in the List of IAU-approved Star Names.

Properties 

Analysis of the spectrum by N. Houk in 1979 shows it to match a stellar classification of B8 III, with the luminosity class of III indicating this is a giant star that has exhausted the supply of hydrogen at its core and evolved away from the main sequence. R. O. Gray  and R. F. Garrison in 1989 found a less evolved class of B8IV-Vs. The luminosity of Gamma Gruis is around 390 times that of the Sun, with a significant portion of the energy emission being in the ultraviolet. Its outer envelope has an effective temperature of 12,520 K, which gives the star a blue-white hue. By way of comparison, the Sun has an azimuthal velocity along its equator of just .

Based upon analysis of data collected during the Hipparcos mission, this star may have a proper motion companion that is causing gravitational perturbation of Gamma Gruis.

See also 
 Traditional Chinese star names#Grus

References

B-type giants
Grus (constellation)
Gruis, Gamma
Durchmusterung objects
207971
108085
8353
Aldhanab